Phonetic reversal is the process of reversing the phonemes or phones of a word or phrase. When the reversal is identical to the original, the word or phrase is called a phonetic palindrome. Phonetic reversal is not entirely identical to backmasking, which is specifically the reversal of recorded sound. This is because pronunciation in speech causes a reversed diphthong to sound different in either direction (e.g. eye  becoming yah ), or differently articulate a consonant depending on where it lies in a word, hence creating an imperfect reversal.

Backmasking involves not only the reversal of the order of phonemes or phones, but the reversal of the allophonic realizations of those phonemes. Strictly speaking, a reversal of phonemes will still result in allophones appropriate for the new position; for example, if a word with a final /t/ is reversed so that the /t/ is initial, the initial /t/ will be aspirated in line with the conventional allophonic patterns of English phonology.

According to proponents of reverse speech, phonetic reversal occurs unknowingly during normal speech.

Examples 
In the 1974 album Rock Bottom, the track Little Red Riding Hood Hit the Road presented the chord progression along with Robert Wyatt's singing being both phonetically reversed at one middle point of the song, which turned the track's harmonics to be reversed from the beginning although Robert Wyatt restarted to sing normally, causing an original and disturbing effect.
In 1982, John Wright of NoMeansNo sang phonetically reversed lyrics on the backing vocal to the "Rich Guns" track on the band's first album, Mama.
In the 1984 American film Amadeus, lead character Wolfgang Mozart claims to Constanze Weber that "[in Salzburg] everything goes backwards". He then proceeds to deliver a series of phonetically reversed phrases, many of them vulgar, which she must guess by reversing them out loud.
In the television drama Twin Peaks, the Man from Another Place's character's speech was phonetically reversed. 
The Simpsons used the technique to parody Twin Peaks in the episode "Who Shot Mr. Burns? (Part Two)".
Singer/songwriter/multi-instrumentalist Jim Ure is better known by his phonetically reversed (first) name Midge Ure.
Kate Bush used phonetic reversal in her songs "Watching You Without Me" (1985) and "Leave it Open" (1982).
The English rock band Radiohead used the effect on the song "Like Spinning Plates", released on their 2001 album Amnesiac. Singer Thom Yorke sang the lyrics backwards; this recording was in turn reversed to create "backwards-sounding" vocals.
A specific recording of the phrase "In the mix" exists that is a phonetic palindrome, and is often used by Turntablist DJs for this reason.
In the 2008 monster film Cloverfield, after the credits, a broken sound recording can be heard of Rob saying "...help us...", as at the end, he and his girlfriend were trapped under a bridge. If reversed, it sounds like Rob saying "...it’s still alive..."
In 2007, backwards speaking radio sensation "Backwards Dave" (David Klempfner) beat the Guinness World Record Holder, David Fuhrer aka "Mr Backwards" in a backwards-speaking competition live on Triple J. In 2008, Dave performed on Australia's Got Talent saying "Does Australia Have Talent?" in phonetic reversal. In 2012 Backwards Dave appeared on Channel 7's Sunrise, an Australian TV show.
During the opening theme song for Gravity Falls, a whisper is heard saying, "I'm still here." However, if one reverses it, it says, "Three Letters Back", which is a clue to the ending credits code. The whisper is changed to "Switch the A with Z" in Double Dipper, "26 Letters" in Bottomless Pit, "Key Vigenere" in Scary-Oke, and "Not What He Seems" in the episode with this title (while still using the Vigenere cipher).
In 2019, an online Phonetic Reverser was created in order to assist in speaking inputted English words or phrases in reverse.

External links 
EV: Audio reversal in popular culture
Boy can talk fluently backward  - Yahoo!7 (November 13, 2013)

References 

Phonetics
Sound